Eschweilera amplexifolia is a species of woody plant in the family Lecythidaceae. It is found only in Panama. It is threatened by habitat loss.

References

amplexifolia
Flora of Panama
Critically endangered plants
Taxonomy articles created by Polbot